John Manners, 8th Earl of Rutland (10 June 160429 September 1679), was an English politician who sat in the House of Commons from 1640 until 1641 when he inherited the title Earl of Rutland on the death of his second cousin George Manners, 7th Earl of Rutland.

Origins
He was the eldest son and heir of Sir George Manners (1569-1623) of Haddon Hall in Derbyshire, 
the eldest son and heir of Sir John Manners (bef.1535-1611), the second son of Thomas Manners, 1st Earl of Rutland of Belvoir Castle. His mother was Grace Pierrepont, a daughter of Sir Henry Pierrepont, MP, of Holme Pierrepont, Nottinghamshire.
The 8th Earl was thus the great-grandson of Thomas Manners, 1st Earl of Rutland.

Career
He was admitted at Queens' College, Cambridge, in spring 1619 and was awarded MA in 1621. He was admitted at the Inner Temple in November 1621. In 1632 he was High Sheriff of Derbyshire. In April 1640 he was elected a Member of Parliament for Derbyshire in the Short Parliament. In 1641 he inherited the title Earl of Rutland on the death of his second cousin George Manners, 7th Earl of Rutland. He was a moderate Parliamentarian and took the covenant in 1643. In 1646 he was Chief Justice in Eyre, North of Trent. After the Restoration of the Monarchy he was appointed By King Charles II as Lord Lieutenant of Leicestershire on 14 February 1667 and held the post until 7 July 1677.

Marriage and children

In 1628 he married Frances Montagu, a daughter of Sir Edward Montagu, 1st Baron Montagu of Boughton, by whom he had one son and six daughters as follows:
John Manners, 1st Duke of Rutland (1638–1711), son and heir;
Lady Grace Manners (died 15 February 1700), who married, first, Patrick Chaworth, 3rd Viscount Chaworth, and after his death, married Sir William Langhorne, 1st Baronet; she died less than a year after this second marriage.
Lady Margaret Manners (died 1682), who married James Cecil, 3rd Earl of Salisbury, and had children.
Lady Frances Manners (c. 1636–1660), who married John Cecil, 4th Earl of Exeter, and had children.
Lady Elizabeth Manners (c. 1654–1700), who married James Annesley, 2nd Earl of Anglesey, and had children.
Lady Dorothy Manners (c. 1656–1698), married Anthony Ashley-Cooper, 2nd Earl of Shaftesbury and had children.
Lady Anne Manners (born 1655), who married Scrope Howe, 1st Viscount Howe.  

In 1677, a legal case before the House of Lords ruled on a legal dispute between the Duke and Scrope Howe over the financial settlement made for Lady Anne and her heirs.

Death and burial
He died aged 75 and was buried in St Mary the Virgin's Church, Bottesford, Leicestershire, where survives his monument. He was succeeded in the earldom by his son John Manners, 1st Duke of Rutland.

References

Sources

1604 births
1679 deaths
08
J
Lord-Lieutenants of Leicestershire
Manners, John
Manners, John
Manners, John
Alumni of Queens' College, Cambridge